Broussaisia arguta, the kanawao, is a species of perennial flowering plant in the Hydrangea family, Hydrangeaceae, that is endemic to Hawaii.  It is the only species in the monotypic genus Broussaisia.

Kanawao is a widespread species occurring in mesic and wet forests on all of the main Hawaiian Islands. It is a dioecious, evergreen plant that either grows as a  shrub or a  tree.

Relationship to other Organisms

The Orthotylus broussaisia (O. broussaisiae) from Kauai feeds on Broussaisia arguta. Although there has been extensive research on Broussaisia arguta, only the Orthotylus broussaisiae species has been found feeding on it.

References

Hydrangeaceae
Cornales genera
Trees of Hawaii
Endemic flora of Hawaii
Monotypic asterid genera
Dioecious plants
Flora without expected TNC conservation status